The 1992 Nigerian Senate election in Niger State was held on July 4, 1992, to elect members of the Nigerian Senate to represent Niger State. Haliru Dantoro representing Niger North, Dangana Ndayako representing Niger South and Ibrahim Kuta representing Niger East all won on the platform of the National Republican Convention.

Overview

Summary

Results

Niger North 
The election was won by Haliru Dantoro of the National Republican Convention.

Niger South 
The election was won by Dangana Ndayako of the National Republican Convention.

Niger East 
The election was won by Ibrahim Kuta of the National Republican Convention.

References 

Nig
Niger State Senate elections
July 1992 events in Nigeria